Squire S. Case (September 27, 1801 – March 30, 1878) was an American businessman and politician.

Born in Hillsdale, New York, he moved to Buffalo, New York in 1822 where he operated a hotel. He served on the Buffalo City Council. Case then served in the New York State Assembly in 1837 and 1842. He also served in the New York Militia. Case then moved to Waukesha, Wisconsin Territory as a result of losing most of his property when work on the Erie Canal was suspended. He settled on a farm in the town of Merton. He was involved in the construction of railroad cars. During that time, he served in the second Wisconsin Constitutional Convention of 1847–1848. He moved to Portage, Wisconsin, in 1857, where he worked as a railroad ticket agent. Finally he moved to Mauston, Wisconsin, where he died in 1878.

References 

1801 births
1878 deaths
People from Hillsdale, New York
People from Waukesha, Wisconsin
Businesspeople from New York (state)
Businesspeople from Wisconsin
Buffalo Common Council members
Members of the New York State Assembly
19th-century American politicians
People from Mauston, Wisconsin
People from Merton, Wisconsin
19th-century American businesspeople